Megalechis picta, the Tail bar armored catfish, Tail bar hoplo or Spotted Hoplo, is a species of catfish of the family Callichthyidae.  M. picta occurs east of the Andes in the Amazon, Orinoco, and upper Essequibo River basins, and coastal rivers of northern Brazil.

References 
 

Megalechis
Fish of Bolivia
Freshwater fish of Brazil
Freshwater fish of Colombia
Freshwater fish of Ecuador
Freshwater fish of Peru
Fish of the Amazon basin
Taxa named by Johannes Peter Müller
Taxa named by Franz Hermann Troschel 
Fish described in 1848